is a private university in Ageo, Saitama, Japan, established in 1988. The motto is "Love God and Serve His People."

The university bases its ideals on Protestant Christianity. The former Seigakuin Atlanta International School was an international school in Greater Atlanta, United States affiliated with the university.

The predecessor of the school was founded in 1903 as a Protestant seminary.

External links

 Official website
 Official website 

Educational institutions established in 1903
Christian universities and colleges in Japan
Private universities and colleges in Japan
Universities and colleges in Saitama Prefecture
Ageo, Saitama
1903 establishments in Japan